Hugh Sherwood Cordery (27 March 1880 – 24 October 1973) was a New Zealand customs official. He was born in Malvern Wells, Worcestershire, England.

References

1880 births
1973 deaths
English emigrants to New Zealand